Galugah County is in Mazandaran province, Iran. The capital of the county is the city of Galugah. At the 2006 census, the county's population was 39,450 in 10,365 households. The following census in 2011 counted 38,847 people in 11,529 households. At the 2016 census, the county's population was 40,078 in 13,147 households.

Administrative divisions

The population history of Galugah County's administrative divisions over three consecutive censuses is shown in the following table. The latest census shows two districts, four rural districts, and one city.

References

 

Counties of Mazandaran Province